Saros cycle series 140 for lunar eclipses occurs at the moon's ascending node, 18 years 11 and 1/3 days. It contains 77 events.

This lunar saros is linked to Solar Saros 147.

See also 
 List of lunar eclipses
 List of Saros series for lunar eclipses

Notes

External links 
 www.hermit.org: Saros 140

Lunar saros series